Popko is a surname. Notable people with the surname include:

Dmitry Popko (born 1996), Russian-born Kazakhstani tennis player
Serhiy Popko, Ukrainian military general and the Commander of the Ukrainian Ground Forces